Elena Ivanova (born 8 November 1979) is a Russian former competitive figure skater. She is the 1995 Finlandia Trophy champion, 1998 Nebelhorn Trophy silver medalist, and 1996 World Junior champion.

Life and career 
Ivanova was born in Nevinnomyssk. When she was six years old, figure skating coach Nina Ruchkina visited her kindergarten in search of talented youth and noticed her. Ivanova's parents approved of the activity and she began skating under Ruchkina. At the age of 10, she became Master of Sports of the USSR and gained the nickname "Iron Felix" because of her calmness on the ice. At the age of 15, she moved from Nevinnomyssk to Samara and graduated from Samara's GUOR (figure skating faculty).

Ivanova represented Russia at four World Junior Championships, winning silver in 1995 (Budapest, Hungary), gold in 1996 (Brisbane, Australia), bronze in 1997 (Seoul, South Korea), and silver in 1998 (Saint John, New Brunswick, Canada). She finished sixth in her Champions Series (Grand Prix) debut, at the 1997 Trophée Lalique.

She retired from competition due to injury and became a skating coach in Vitebsk, Belarus. Around 2005, she relocated to Daugavpils, Latvia.

Results 
GP: Champions Series / Grand Prix

References

Russian female single skaters
Living people
1979 births
World Junior Figure Skating Championships medalists
People from Nevinnomyssk
Russian expatriates in Latvia
Sportspeople from Stavropol Krai